Floerkea is a monotypic genus of plants in the meadowfoam family containing the sole species Floerkea proserpinacoides, which is known by the common names false mermaid, false mermaidweed, and floerkea. This tiny wildflower is native to many parts of North America, where it is found in moist areas such as shady forests. It is a fleshy, annual herb which grows short stems which may lie flat on the ground, tangle into a clump, or grow somewhat erect. The foliage is hairless and shiny. The flower is a cup of pointed green sepals containing three tiny white spoon-shaped petals and a bunch of stamens with yellow anthers. Growing in the center of the flower are the two to three fruits, which are bumpy, spherical nutlets.

The logo for the Flora of North America is a Floerkea flower. The genus was named in honor of the German botanist, Heinrich Gustav Flörke.

References

External links
 Photo gallery at CalPhotos

Limnanthaceae
Monotypic Brassicales genera
Flora of North America